Swart House and Tavern is a historic home and tavern located at Glenville in Schenectady County, New York. It consists of a long, 2-story, rectangular gable-roofed structure with a -story rear wing. The rear wing was built about 1750 and the building was substantially enlarged about 1792 in the Federal style.  Also on the property is a stone masonry smokehouse.

It was listed on the National Register of Historic Places in 2007.

Born in the Schoharie Valley in 1718, Adam Swart did not move to Schenectady until his marriage to Catherine Van Patten in 1742. Their son Nicholas built the Swart Tavern in the late 18th century, a building which is still standing, but no longer in use as a tavern. A circa 1840 painting of the Swart Tavern is also on display.

References

Houses on the National Register of Historic Places in New York (state)
Houses in Schenectady County, New York
Federal architecture in New York (state)
Houses completed in 1795
National Register of Historic Places in Schenectady County, New York